Subterinebrica is a genus of moths belonging to the family Tortricidae.

Species
Subterinebrica albitaeniana Razowski & Wojtusiak, 2008
Subterinebrica festivaria Razowski & Wojtusiak, 2009
Subterinebrica impolluta Razowski & Becker, 2002
Subterinebrica labyrinthana Razowski & Wojtusiak, 2009
Subterinebrica magnitaeniana Razowski & Wojtusiak, 2008
Subterinebrica nigrosignatana Razowski & Wojtusiak, 2008

See also
List of Tortricidae genera

References
Notes

Bibliography
 , 2005, World Catalogue of Insects 5
 , 2002: Black and white forewing pattern in Tortricidae (Lepidoptera), with descriptions of new taxa of Neotropical Euliini. Acta zoologica cracoviensia 45 (3): 245–257. Full article: 
 , 2009: Tortricidae (Lepidoptera) from the mountains of Ecuador and remarks on their geographical distribution. Part IV. Eastern Cordillera. Acta Zoologica Cracoviensia 51B (1-2): 119–187. doi:10.3409/azc.52b_1-2.119-187. Full article: .

External links
tortricidae.com

Euliini
Tortricidae genera